The Houston Post-Dispatch Building, located at 609 Fannin in Houston, Texas, was listed on the National Register of Historic Places on February 14, 2002.

See also
 National Register of Historic Places listings in Harris County, Texas

References

Buildings and structures completed in 1926
Buildings and structures in Houston
National Register of Historic Places in Houston
Newspaper buildings
Newspaper headquarters in the United States
Neoclassical architecture in Texas
Office buildings on the National Register of Historic Places in Texas
Downtown Houston